Eve D'Souza (born 11 March 1979) is a Kenyan media personality, radio presenter and actress. She was a radio presenter at 98.4 Capital FM from 2001 until she left in November 2010.

Early life 
D'Souza was born on 11 March, 1979 in Mombasa, Kenya to Andrew and Martina D’Souza. She has two siblings, Sharon and Jason D’Souza. She attended Loreto Convent and Aga Khan High School, Mombasa. She later joined Catholic University of Eastern Africa, Nairobi where she attained a Bachelor of Education degree in English and English Literature.

Personal life 
D'Souza married Simon Anderson on 16 November 2020 in a private wedding.

Career 
In 2001, she joined 98.4 Capital FM till November 2010 hosting Mid morning show, Hits not Home work, The East African Chart and Capital in the Morning.
D'Souza later ran Moonbeam Productions, a television producer responsible for Auntie Boss!, a sitcom that she co-produces and stars in, and became an "ambassador" for Store 66, a clothing store in Nairobi.

Filmography

Awards and nominations

References 

1979 births
Living people
People from Mombasa
Kenyan people of Goan descent
Kenyan people of Indian descent
Kenyan television actresses
Kenyan radio presenters
Catholic University of Eastern Africa alumni
Kenyan women radio presenters